The three certified agreements case was a decision of the Australian Industrial Relations Commission that resolved the confusion created by the High Court's decision of Electrolux v AWU.

Name
The three certified agreements case, or In Re Schefenacker, the Australian Nursing Federation and the Rural City of Murray Bridge, was a case that combined appeals from decisions of a single commissioner not to certify enterprise agreements, as it was believed that the agreements contained clauses that did not pertain to the relationship between employer and employee: 
 The Murray Bridge Enterprise Bargaining Agreement 
 The Schefenacker Vision Systems Enterprise Bargaining Agreement
 The La Trobe University Enterprise Bargaining Agreement

Background
The decision was necessary to clarify the High Court of Australia's decision Electrolux v AWU, which caused much uncertainty existed on could be placed into enterprise bargaining agreements.

Significance

The decision was handed down on 21 March 2005. The case got major attention around Australia. It was one of the longest-awaited decisions in industrial relations law, as industrial relations professionals had awaited clarification of Electrolux of the High Court of Australia for over five months.

It is commonly regarded as the final landmark decision of the Australian Industrial Relations Commission. (That is before its wage setting, award formation and agreement certification powers were removed from it by the WorkChoices reform in 2006.)

Decision
The case dealt with whether a large number of union-friendly provisions such as these: 
 union training leave 
 the recognition of delegates 
 right of entry 
 salary sacrifice 
 use of labour hire (and setting or terms of conditions for labour hire)

The case decided that the matters (in certain forms) could be included into enterprise agreements (and awards would have been followed). It was generally accepted as a major union victory.

Australian labour law
2005 in case law
2005 in Australian law